Patrik Blahút (born 7 October 1997) is a Slovak professional footballer who plays as a midfielder for Fortuna Liga club Podbrezová.

Club career

FK Pohronie
Blahút made his Fortuna Liga debut for Pohronie in the club's premier first division match against Slovan Bratislava on 20 July 2019 at Mestský štadión.

References

External links
 FK Pohronie official club profile 
 
 
 Futbalnet profile 

1997 births
Living people
People from Žarnovica District
Sportspeople from the Banská Bystrica Region
Slovak footballers
Association football midfielders
FK Pohronie players
FK Železiarne Podbrezová players
Slovak Super Liga players
2. Liga (Slovakia) players